St. Mary's Church is a church in Reutlingen, Germany. It was built from 1247 to 1343 and is one of the most distinct Gothic buildings in Swabia.

Between the 1520s and 1540s the church was a center of the Swabian reformer Matthäus Alber, who spread the teachings of Martin Luther to Reutlingen and surrounding areas. The church was heavily damaged during a fire in 1726. From 1893 to 1901 it was rebuilt in Neo-Gothic style. On the 71-meter high west tower shines a gilded angel from 1343.

The church has been a National Cultural Landmark since 1988.

External links 
Protestant community of Reutlingen 
Reutlingen tourism 

Mary
Reutlingen Mary
Reutlingen Mary
Reutlingen Mary
Reutlingen Mary
Reutlingen Mary
Reutlingen Mary